Christopher John Leitch ( – 20 January 2023) was a New Zealand politician. He was the leader of the Social Credit Party from 2018 until his death in 2023.

Biography

Early life and career
Leitch was interested in soccer and cricket as a child and at age 11 also became interested in dancing (also an interest of his parents) and danced first socially and then competitively. He won the Auckland region youth age division competitions and later was the winner of multiple national competitions between the age of 15 and 17. By the time he was 18 he began teaching dancing as well while still learning himself, being tutored by Maurice Taylor, one of New Zealand's leading dance examiners and fellow of the New Zealand Federal Association of Dance Teachers. Aged 20 Leitch moved to Whangarei where, with the help of his parents, he established his own dance studio named "The John Leitch Dance Studio" covering nine other Northland towns. He was a life member of the New Zealand Federal Association of Teachers of Dancing, which registered with the New Zealand Council of Dance and affiliated to both the equivalent Australian association and the Imperial Society of Teachers of Dancing in London.

Political career
Leitch joined the Social Credit Party in the early 1970s, "to try to make a difference" following his father's example. His first campaigning was for former Whangarei mayor Joyce Ryan, later becoming chairman of Social Credit's Whangarei Branch. In 1988 he became President of the Democrat Party. At the end of 1991 the Democrats joined an alliance of four parties (alongside the NewLabour Party, Mana Motuhake and the Greens) which became known as the Alliance.

He was selected to be the Alliance candidate at the 1992 Tamaki by-election caused by the resignation of Sir Robert Muldoon. The National government was unpopular at the time after reneging on several election pledges. Leitch campaigned well and was ahead in two of the three opinion polls conducted holding an eight point lead over National Party candidate Clem Simich five days before election day. Leitch did not win the normally safe National seat, but reduced National's majority by 29.5% and pushed the Labour Party candidate into a distant third place, describing his near victory as a "miracle". Soon after his Tamaki campaign  he stood as a candidate at the 1992 local-body elections for the newly created Auckland Regional Services Trust on the Alliance ticket and was successful. He remained a member of the trust until 1997 when he decided to retire from politics.

At the  he stood again in Whangarei and was second on the list.

In 2015 Leitch was the Northland organiser of a campaign opposing the Trans-Pacific Partnership, and later an organiser for a similar campaign in 2017 opposed to Chinese involvement in the financing and construction of infrastructure in Northland. In late-2017 he stood in a by-election for the Whangarei District Council in the Denby Ward, but was unsuccessful.

In June 2018 Leitch was elected party leader and the party voted to change its name back to Social Credit. Under Leitch's leadership the party increased activities frequently putting out press releases and occasionally full-page ads in newspapers. On 8 February 2022, Social Credit released a press statement advocating for an end to the government's vaccine mandate. Leitch travelled to Wellington to attend the anti-mandate 2022 Wellington protests and spoke to protesters directly on 11 February 2022. Leitch later called for the government to compensate all people who lost their jobs due to vaccine mandate regulations.

Personal life
Leitch was married to a former dance partner, Anne Wood, who travelled to the United Kingdom and studied dance techniques under ballroom A-listers. They were a couple off the dance floor at the time before going their separate ways, each marrying other people before meeting again in later life and marrying.

Leitch died of cancer on 20 January 2023, aged 70.

Notes

References

1950s births
2023 deaths
New Zealand male dancers
New Zealand dance teachers
People from Whangārei
Social Credit Party (New Zealand) politicians
New Zealand Democratic Party for Social Credit politicians
Alliance (New Zealand political party) politicians
Unsuccessful candidates in the 1984 New Zealand general election
Unsuccessful candidates in the 1987 New Zealand general election
Unsuccessful candidates in the 2014 New Zealand general election
Unsuccessful candidates in the 2017 New Zealand general election
Unsuccessful candidates in the 2020 New Zealand general election
Local politicians in New Zealand
Leaders of political parties in New Zealand
20th-century New Zealand politicians
21st-century New Zealand politicians
Deaths from cancer in New Zealand